Bridgeport is a city in Morrill County, Nebraska, United States. The population was 1,454 at the 2020 census. It is the county seat of Morrill County.

History
Bridgeport got its start in the year 1899, following construction of the Chicago, Burlington and Quincy Railroad through the territory. The town that sprang up took its name from a bridge over the North Platte River. Bridgeport was incorporated as a village in 1901.

Geography
Bridgeport is located at  (41.667643, -103.098787).

Demographics

2010 census
As of the census of 2010, there were 1,545 people, 644 households, and 407 families residing in the city. The racial makeup of the city was 87.1% White, 0.5% African American, 1.9% Native American, 0.8% Asian, 8.1% from other races, and 1.6% from two or more races. Hispanic or Latino of any race were 19.2% of the population.

There were 644 households, of which 30.0% had children under the age of 18 living with them, 50.0% were married couples living together, 9.6% had a female householder with no husband present, 3.6% had a male householder with no wife present, and 36.8% were non-families. 33.7% of all households were made up of individuals, and 19% had someone living alone who was 65 years of age or older. The average household size was 2.34 and the average family size was 3.01.

The median age in the city was 40.3 years. 25.7% of residents were under the age of 18; 8% were between the ages of 18 and 24; 21.8% were from 25 to 44; 23.5% were from 45 to 64; and 21.1% were 65 years of age or older. The gender makeup of the city was 47.1% male and 52.9% female.

2000 census
As of the census of 2000, there were 1,594 people, 654 households, and 419 families residing in the city. The population density was 1,671.1 people per square mile (647.8/km2). There were 723 housing units at an average density of 758.0 per square mile (293.8/km2). The racial makeup of the city was 90.72% White, 0.13% African American, 1.57% Native American, 0.31% Asian, 4.96% from other races, and 2.32% from two or more races. Hispanic or Latino of any race were 14.81% of the population.

There were 654 households, out of which 30.6% had children under the age of 18 living with them, 53.2% were married couples living together, 7.5% had a female householder with no husband present, and 35.8% were non-families. 32.9% of all households were made up of individuals, and 15.9% had someone living alone who was 65 years of age or older. The average household size was 2.38 and the average family size was 3.03.

In the city, the population was spread out, with 26.1% under the age of 18, 7.3% from 18 to 24, 25.2% from 25 to 44, 22.5% from 45 to 64, and 18.9% who were 65 years of age or older. The median age was 39 years. For every 100 females, there were 90.4 males. For every 100 females age 18 and over, there were 88.8 males.

As of 2000 the median income for a household in the city was $29,527, and the median income for a family was $37,813. Males had a median income of $30,037 versus $18,500 for females. The per capita income for the city was $14,320. About 7.7% of families and 12.0% of the population were below the poverty line, including 15.6% of those under age 18 and 9.4% of those age 65 or over.

Education
The Bridgeport Public Schools school district has one elementary school and one junior/senior high school, both located in Bridgeport.

Climate 
The data below are from the WRCC, compiled from 1897 to when this chart was created (July 2018). The lowest temperature ever recorded in the state of Nebraska (-47 °F) was witnessed at Bridgeport on February 12, 1899. This record was later tied by the city of Oshkosh on December 22, 1989; that month, Bridgeport fell to -42 °F.

References

External links
 City website

Cities in Nebraska
Cities in Morrill County, Nebraska
County seats in Nebraska